Mr. Fresh and the Supreme Rockers were a breakdancing group known for their classic book, Breakdancing: Mr. Fresh and the Supreme Rockers Show You How, published in 1984. The book was a common introductory reference for newcomers to the "breakin'" style of dance as it evolved in North America in the 1970s and 1980s.

See also
 Hip hop music
 Street dance

External links
 History of Breaking extract from "Breakdancing: Mr. Fresh and the Supreme Rickers Show You How"

Breakdancing groups